Chagallu is a village in Palnadu district of the Indian state of Andhra Pradesh. It is located in Nekarikallu mandal of Sattenapalle revenue division.

Demographics 

 Census of India, the town had a population of 6,648. The total population constitute, 1,066 males and 1,236 females —a sex ratio of 1,156 females per 1000 males, higher than the national average of 995 per 1000. 705 children are in the age group of 0–6 years, of which 361 are boys and 344 are girls—a ratio of 953 per 1000. The average literacy rate stands at 56.86% with 3,379 literates, significantly lower than the national average of 73.00%.

Governance 

Chagallu gram panchayat is the local self-government of the village. It is divided into wards and each ward is represented by a ward member.

Education 

As per the school information report for the academic year 2018–19, the village has a total of 5 Zilla Parishad/MPP schools.

See also 
List of villages in Guntur district

References 

Villages in Guntur district